WFXP (channel 66) is a television station in Erie, Pennsylvania, United States, affiliated with the Fox network. It is owned by Mission Broadcasting, which maintains a local marketing agreement (LMA) with Nexstar Media Group, owner of ABC affiliate WJET-TV (channel 24), for the provision of certain services. The two stations share studios on US 19/Peach Street in Summit Township (with an Erie mailing address), where WFXP's transmitter is also located.

WFXP began broadcasting in 1986 as WETG, owned by Gannon University, a Catholic university in Erie. It gradually became a more typical commercial independent in its early years of operation and affiliated with Fox in April 1990. The growth of Fox led to new affiliate requirements that saw Gannon sell the station to private owners. Nexstar has managed WFXP since 1998 and airs dedicated morning and late evening newscasts from the WJET-TV newsroom on the station.

History
Channel 66 in Erie began broadcasting September 2, 1986, as WETG, operated by a joint venture of Gannon University and the Roman Catholic Diocese of Erie. Gannon had won the permit to build the station from a pool of three applicants in 1984 and promised to broadcast religious and entertainment programs as well as telecourses. Gannon students produced programs for the station, including a televised Mass and daily talk show, and participated in station operations for credit; in 1989, 46 of the 96 students in the university's communication arts program were involved in running WETG. By that time, the station's broadcast day had expanded from eight hours a day at launch to 15 hours, and the programming had grown more typical of an independent.

In April 1990, WETG became Erie's first Fox affiliate. Gannon University continued to own the station until 1994, when the network began increasing its requirements for affiliated stations. As a result, the university sold the station to a consortium of local investors known as Erie Broadcasting. Power was increased from 35,000 to 600,000 watts, and the call sign was changed to WFXP; though the studios were to move off the Gannon campus, this did not take place. Erie Broadcasters then sold the station to Jason Elkin, former founder of New Vision Television; Elkin also tried to buy NBC affiliate WICU-TV but withdrew when the Telecommunications Act of 1996 failed to authorize the creation of duopolies, common direct ownership of two stations in a market. He instead assigned his option to buy to SJL Broadcasting. WICU then filed to run WFXP under an LMA, a move delayed by an objection by WJET-TV, which had lost out on an attempt to take control of the station.

In 1998, Nexstar—the new owner of WJET-TV—entered into an agreement to maintain responsibility for WFXP's daily operations except programming, with WICU citing the fact that it looked unable to acquire channel 66 outright in the near future; Nexstar had more experience with lease arrangements. Digital broadcasting for WFXP in high definition began in December 2007.

Newscasts

In May 1997, WFXP began broadcasting a 10 p.m. newscast produced for it by WICU-TV. WJET-TV assumed production of this newscast on August 1, 1998.

On September 10, 2007, WJET-TV began airing an hour-long weekday morning show at 8 on WFXP (called Fox 66 News in the Morning). This is the only local newscast in the area broadcasting in the time-slot.

Subchannels
The station's digital signal is multiplexed:

References

External links

FXP
Fox network affiliates
Grit (TV network) affiliates
Bounce TV affiliates
Antenna TV affiliates
Television channels and stations established in 1986
1986 establishments in Pennsylvania
Nexstar Media Group